Peter Baumgartner (14 February 1939 – 23 August 2021) was a Swiss cinematographer. He worked frequently with the producer-director Erwin C. Dietrich during his career. He was the nephew of the composer Walter Baumgartner.

Selected filmography
 Two Bavarians in Bonn (1962)
 St. Pauli zwischen Nacht und Morgen (1967)
 Die Nichten der Frau Oberst (1968)
 Bed Hostesses (1973)
 Jack the Ripper (1976)
 Love Letters of a Portuguese Nun (1977)
 High Test Girls (1980)
 Code Name: Wild Geese (1984)
 Commando Leopard (1985)

References

Bibliography 
 Peter Cowie & Derek Elley. World Filmography: 1967. Fairleigh Dickinson University Press, 1977.

External links 
 

1939 births
2021 deaths
Film people from Zürich
Swiss cinematographers